Qarah Jaqayah (also Romanized as Qarā Jāqayah; also known as Qarājeh Qeyeh) is a village in Rudbar Rural District, in the Central District of Tafresh County, Markazi Province, Iran. At the 2006 census, its population was 129, in 44 families.

References 

Populated places in Tafresh County